The Milanese coachbuilder Carrozzeria Colli was established by Giuseppe Colli in 1931 and included his four sons, Mario, Candido, Beniamino and Tarcisio.
The company was specialized in using aluminium its works. The first automobiles it made were racing cars using Fiat 1100 mechanicals and chassis, also Fiat 500, Lancia Astura and Aprilia were used as basis. During the World War II the company worked for airforces and after the war made car bodies.  After the war they made couple of Alfa Romeo 6C 2500SS, (Fiat 6C 1500cc)  Lancia Aprilia based cars and for the 1947 Villa d'Este a Fiat 500 barchetta. 

Colli made one very special prototype in 1946, the Aerauto PL.5C roadable aircraft. From the 1950s it worked with Alfa Romeo making cars such as 6C 3000CM and its own single variant of Disco Volante. The company built also Giulietta and Giulia estate cars in the 1960s.
In 1955 Colli constructed the very shortly used Arzani-Volpini Formula One car utilising a twin-supercharged Maserati 1500 inline-four engine.

Colli made car bodies until 1973.

References 

Coachbuilders of Italy
Milan motor companies
Vehicle manufacturing companies established in 1931
Italian companies established in 1931
Italian brands